Ayumi Hamasaki Complete Live Box A is a box Set DVD compilation album by Japanese pop singer Ayumi Hamasaki. This collection consisted of 2 DVDs previously released, and 2 exclusive to the Complete Live Box. In total, the Complete Live Box and its previously released DVDs sold over 90,000 copies. The DVDs included are:
Ayumi Hamasaki Countdown Live 2001-2002 A*
Ayumi Hamasaki Arena Tour 2002 A
Ayumi Hamasaki Stadium Tour 2002 A
Ayumi Hamasaki Countdown Live 2002-2003 A*

*Appeared only in the Complete Live Box

Ayumi Hamasaki compilation albums